Thar or THAR may refer to:

 Himalayan tahr (Hemitragus jemlahicus), an ungulate, also known as thar, 
 Thar (river), France
 Tharparkar, a region in Sindh, Pakistan
 Mahindra Thar, a subcompact four-wheel drive sport utility vehicle (SUV)
 Thar (film), a 2022 Hindi-language Western thriller

See also 
 
 There (disambiguation)